Falling Water is an American supernatural drama television series. A commercial-free advance preview of the pilot aired on September 21, 2016 ahead of its October 13, 2016 premiere. On April 3, 2017 USA Network renewed the series for a second season, with Rémi Aubuchon replacing Blake Masters as the showrunner. On May 18, 2018, USA announced they had cancelled the series.

The pilot was written and co-created by Masters and Henry Bromell before Bromell died in 2013. In honor to his work, Bromell is still listed as a co-creator and receives a producer credit.

Plot
Three strangers realize they are dreaming parts of the same dream. As they delve deeper into the meaning behind their connection to each other, they realize that the implications are much larger than their personal fates, and the future of the world lies in their hands.

Cast and characters

Main
 David Ajala as Burton, head of The Firm's in-house security
 Lizzie Brocheré as Tess, a trend spotter
 Will Yun Lee as Taka, an NYPD detective
 Kai Lennox as Woody Hammond, private equity specialist at The Firm
 Anna Wood as Olivia Watson aka The Woman in Red (season 1; "special guest star" in season 2)
 Zak Orth as Bill Boerg, founder and CEO of Boerg Industries
 Sepideh Moafi as Alexis Simms, Taka's new partner in homicide (season 2)

Recurring
 Jodi Long as Kumiko, Taka's catatonic mother
 Brooke Bloom (season 1) and Brittany Allen (season 2) as Sabine, Tess' older sister
 Melanie Nicholls-King as Ann Marie Bowen, a woman Taka comes across who may be in a cult (season 1)
 Neal Huff as Nicholas Hull, the CEO of The Firm, the company Burton works for
 Mary McCormack as Taylor Bennett, a mysterious but powerful woman who hires Woody Hammond to manipulate other people's dreams (season 2)

Production
The series is filmed in Toronto, Ontario; primarily at Cinespace Film Studios' Kipling Avenue facility.

Episodes

Season 1 (2016)

Season 2 (2018)

Reception

Critical response
Falling Water has received mixed reviews from critics. The review aggregator website Rotten Tomatoes reported a 28% approval rating, with an average rating of 5.21/10 based on 18 reviews. The website's consensus states, "Falling Water attempts complexity and intrigue but churns out an unimaginative concept lacking a redeemable payoff." Metacritic, which uses a weighted average, assigned a score of 50 out of 100 based on 14 reviews, indicating "Mixed or average reviews".

Awards and nominations

Notes

References

External links
 
 

2010s American drama television series
2016 American television series debuts
2018 American television series endings
2010s American supernatural television series
English-language television shows
Serial drama television series
Television series by Universal Content Productions
USA Network original programming
American thriller television series
Television shows about dreams